Byron Black and Jonathan Stark were the defending champions but did not compete that year.

Brent Haygarth and Christo van Rensburg won in the final 6–1, 6–4 against Karim Alami and Gábor Köves.

Seeds
Champion seeds are indicated in bold text while text in italics indicates the round in which those seeds were eliminated.

 Rodolphe Gilbert /  Menno Oosting (semifinals)
 Brent Haygarth /  Christo van Rensburg (champions)
 Mathias Huning /  Jon Ireland (quarterfinals)
 Omar Camporese /  Emilio Sánchez (semifinals)

Draw

External links
 1996 Internazionali di Carisbo Doubles draw

Bologna Outdoor
1996 ATP Tour